Pelethiphis is a genus of mites in the family Eviphididae.

References

Mesostigmata
Articles created by Qbugbot